Winter Sports: The Ultimate Challenge (called RTL Winter Sports 2008: The Ultimate Challenge in Europe) is a multi-sport simulation developed by German studio 49 Games released in 2007 for the PlayStation 2, Wii, and Microsoft Windows.  It was developed by 49 Games, the developers of Torino 2006.

Sports and events
Downhill skiing
Super-G, slalom, and giant slalom
Ski jumping
Normal hill
Large Hill
Bobsledding
Two-man
Four-man
Men's luge
Men's skeleton
Speed skating
500m
1000m
Curling
Cross-country skiing
Figure skating

Reception

The PlayStation 2 and Wii versions received "mixed" reviews according to the review aggregation website Metacritic.

See also
Torino 2006
Winter Sports 2: The Next Challenge
List of Wii games

References

External links
 Conspiracy Entertainment's site
 RTL Games's site (German)
 Developer's site (German)
 

2007 video games
Skiing video games
Wii games
PlayStation 2 games
Video games developed in Germany
Windows games
Figure skating video games
Conspiracy Entertainment games
Multiplayer and single-player video games